The Universal Numbering System, sometimes called the "American System", is a dental notation system commonly used in the United States.

Most of the rest of the world uses the FDI World Dental Federation notation, accepted as an international standard by the International Standards Organization as ISO 3950. However, dentists in the United Kingdom commonly still use the older Palmer notation despite the difficulty in representing its graphical components in computerized (non-handwritten) records.

Left and right
Dental charts are normally arranged from the viewpoint of a dental practitioner facing a patient.  The patient's right side appears on the left side of the chart, and the patient's left side appears on the right side of the chart.

The labels "right" and "left" on the charts in this article correspond to the patient's right and left, respectively.

Universal numbering system 

Although it is named the "universal numbering system", it is also called the "American system" as it is only used in the United States.  The uppercase letters A through T are used for primary teeth and the numbers 1 - 32 are used for permanent teeth.  The tooth designated "1" is the maxillary right third molar ("wisdom tooth") and the count continues along the upper teeth to the left side. Then the count begins at the mandibular left third molar, designated number 17, and continues along the bottom teeth to the right side. Each tooth has a unique number or letter, allowing for easier use on keyboards.

Tooth numbering

Permanent teeth and their assigned numbers (Universal Tooth Numbering System)

Upper right

Upper left

Lower left

Lower right

See also
 Dental notation
 FDI World Dental Federation notation
 Palmer Notation Method

References

External links
Dr. Bunn page on dental notations.
Video regarding the Universal Numbering System

.